Södermanland County is a constituency of the Riksdag, currently electing 11 of its 349 members.

History
The constituency elected 11 members in the 2014 elections, but was reduced to 10 seats for the 2018 elections due to demographics.

Results

2022

2018 election

References

Riksdag constituencies
Södermanland County